The 1987 European Women Basketball Championship, commonly called EuroBasket Women 1987, was the 21st regional championship held by FIBA Europe. The competition was held in Spain and took place from 4 September to 11 September 1987.  won the gold medal and  the silver medal while  won the bronze.

First stage

Group A

Group B

Play-off stages

Final standings

External links 
 FIBA Europe profile
 Todor66 profile

1987
Bas
International women's basketball competitions hosted by Spain
September 1987 sports events in Europe
Euro
Euro